The Electoral district of Counties of Murray and St Vincent was an electorate of the New South Wales Legislative Council at a time when some of its members were elected and the balance were appointed by the Governor. It was a new electorate created in 1851 by the expansion of the Legislative Council to 54, 18 to be appointed and 36 elected. The district consisted of the rural areas of Murray County, which had previously been part of Counties of Murray, King and Georgiana, and St Vincent County, which had previously been part of Counties of St Vincent and Auckland. The towns of Braidwood and Queanbeyan were not part of the district, being included in Southern Boroughs.

In 1856 the unicameral Legislative Council was abolished and replaced with an elected Legislative Assembly and an appointed Legislative Council. The district was represented by the Legislative Assembly electorate of United Counties of Murray and St Vincent.

Members

Election results

1851

1855
Alick Osborne resigned in February 1855.

References

Former electoral districts of New South Wales Legislative Council
1851 establishments in Australia
1856 disestablishments in Australia